Ivan Delacherois Neill CB OBE (10 July 1912 – 18 June 2001) was an Anglican priest and British Army officer. He served as a military chaplain during World War II and served as Chaplain General from 1960 to 1966 and as Chaplain to the Queen. After leaving the army, he was Provost of Sheffield Cathedral.

Early life
Neill was born on 10 July 1912 at the Templeharry rectory in County Tipperary, Ireland. His father, the Rev. Robert Richard Neill, was a Church of Ireland priest who was later the rector of Tooting Graveney. He spent his early childhood in Cork. He and his family left Ireland for England when the Irish War of Independence broke out.

Having won a scholarship, he was educated at St Dunstan's College, an all-boys private school in London. His parents wanted him to become a missionary doctor so he began the study of medicine at the Medical College of St Bartholomew's Hospital. However, deciding that he was better suited to the priesthood, he left. He went on to study theology at Jesus College, Cambridge, and priestly formation at the London College of Divinity.

Ordained ministry
Neill was ordained at St Paul's Cathedral, London, in 1935. He then served as a curate at St Mary's Church, West Kensington, where his father was the vicar. In 1937, he moved to Christ Church, Crouch End.

In 1939, he joined the Royal Army Chaplains' Department. He was granted a temporary commission into the British Army on 18 April 1939 as a Chaplain to the Forces 4th class (equivalent in rank to captain). He was posted to France with the 3rd Division as part of the British Expeditionary Force. He was evacuated from Dunkirk on HMS Vivacious, a destroyer. During the crossing, he conducted a burial at sea for a soldier who died after they had left France. His commission was confirmed on 1 October 1943. In May 1945, he was a temporary Chaplain to the Forces 3rd class (equivalent to major).

He remained an army chaplain after the war. He served for one year in Germany as Deputy Assistant Chaplain General with the I Corps, British Army of the Rhine. He was promoted to Chaplain to the Forces 3rd class (equivalent to major) on 19 August 1947.

He rose in time to be its Chaplain-General. In 1966 he became Provost of Sheffield, a post he held until 1974.

Later life
Neill served as chairman of the board of governors of Monkton Combe School near Bath, Somerset from 1969 to 1981.

He died on 18 June 2001.

Honours and decorations
In May 1945, he was mentioned in despatches 'in recognition of gallant and distinguished services in North-West Europe'. In May 1947, he was appointed Knight Officer of the Order of Orange-Nassau with swords by the Queen of the Netherlands 'in recognition of distinguished services in the cause of the Allies'.

He was an Honorary Chaplain to the Queen.

References

	

1912 births
People educated at St Dunstan's College
Alumni of Jesus College, Cambridge
20th-century English Anglican priests
Knights of the Order of Orange-Nassau
Officers of the Order of the British Empire
Chaplains General to the Forces
Companions of the Order of the Bath
Honorary Chaplains to the Queen
Provosts and Deans of Sheffield
2001 deaths
World War II chaplains
British Army personnel of World War II
Alumni of the London College of Divinity
People from County Tipperary
Officers of the Order of Orange-Nassau
Governors of Monkton Combe School